Karthik Subbaraj is an Indian film director, writer and producer working mainly in Tamil cinema.

Life and career 
Karthik did his schooling in SBOA Matriculation and Higher Secondary School, Madurai after which he went on to study Mechatronics at Thiagarajar College of Engineering. During his college days he performed stage shows and skits. His father, Gajaraj, is an actor who has acted in many supporting roles in films like Mundasupatti and Kabali.

He made the short film "Kaatchipizhai" in Madurai, which was selected for Nalaya Iyakunar.

Karthik had intended to direct Jigarthanda first but could not fund the project. He then came up with the story for the low-budget Pizza which introduced the 7.1 sound system. The film was a commercial success, remade in Hindi, Bengali and Kannada. This allowed him the opportunity to make Jigarthanda, which received positive reviews and earned actor Bobby Simha a national award. Subbaraj was praised by industry stalwarts like director S. Shankar and Mani Ratnam. His third movie, Iraivi (2016), received positive reviews and Subbaraj was praised for the film's portrayal of society's treatment of women. The movie also observed the various ways men's attitudes and behaviors impact women throughout life. He also showcased the pain he gothrough from the producer of his second film, through the character of SJ Surya. He then went on and directed a silent thriller, Mercury (2018), starring Prabhu Deva in its lead, which was not a commercial success. He produced Kallachirippu, a web series under his banner Stone bench.

Subbaraj directed the action drama Petta (2019) with Rajinikanth's 166th film. Kalanithi Maran of Sun Pictures produced the film while Anirudh Ravichander composed the film's music, replacing Santhosh Narayanan who composed for the director's previous ventures. Nawazuddin Siddiqui made his Tamil film debut with this film. In the meanwhile, he produced the Amazon original movie Penguin starring Keerthy Suresh in the lead role. He produced the Hotstar Originals web series Triples starring Jai and Vani Bhojan. He also directed Vikram’s starrer Mahaan which was directly premiered on Amazon Prime Video.

He then directed Miracle, a short film for the Amazon Anthology film  Putham Pudhu Kaalai (2020).

Filmography

References

External links 
 

Living people
21st-century Indian film directors
Artists from Madurai
Tamil film directors
1983 births